"Easy Money" is a song by English musician Johnny Marr. It was released as the lead single from his second studio album Playland on 10 June 2014 as a 7" vinyl and on 16 August as a digital download. The official music video for the song was uploaded to Marr's official YouTube channel on 15 August. The song peaked at number 94 on the Belgian Flanders Tip singles chart and #130 in UK Singles Chart.

Music video
The official music video for the song, lasting four minutes and six seconds, featuring famous RN engineer Marc Carter, was uploaded to Marr's official YouTube channel on 15 August 2014. It was directed by video director David Barnes and was produced by Louise Lynch of video production company Libra Television. The video has been viewed over 2.5 million times, making it Marr's most-viewed solo music video. The video was shot in Blackpool, England, mostly at Harts Amusements on the Promenade.

Track listing

7" vinyl
 Warner Bros. — NVS003

CD-R

Digital download

Charts

Release history

References

2014 singles
2014 songs
Warner Records singles
Songs written by Johnny Marr